More of Old Golden Throat is a compilation album and 32nd overall album released by American country musician Johnny Cash exclusively in the UK on CBS Records in 1969 (see 1969 in music). Culled from single sides that had not previously appeared on albums (with the exceptions of "Honky-Tonk Girl" and "Lorena"), it is primarily made up of lesser-known songs, although "You Beat All I Ever Saw" and "Second Honeymoon" reached No. 20 and No. 15 respectively on the Country charts.  Tracks 4, 7, 10 and 13 are instrumentals originally credited to "The Tennessee Two and Friend."

As with its predecessor, Old Golden Throat, this album was only available in monaural since its source material was originally mixed for single release.

This album has not been released on CD. Although the Cash solo recordings featured here were later included in the 63-disc 2012 release Johnny Cash: The Complete Columbia Album Collection on the bonus disc titled "The Singles, Plus", the four tracks credited to The Tennessee Two and Friend are omitted and have yet to be officially released on CD.

Track listing

Personnel

 Johnny Cash - Vocals, Guitar
 Luther Perkins, Johnny Western - Guitar
 Bob Johnson - Guitar, Mandocello
 Norman Blake - Guitar, Dobro
 Marshall Grant - Bass
 Buddy Harman, W.S. Holland, Fury Kazak - Drums
 Floyd Cramer, Harold Bradley, James Wilson - Piano
 Boots Randolph - Saxophone
 The Anita Kerr Singers, The Carter Family - Background Vocals

Charts
Album – Billboard (United States)

External links
 Luma Electronic entry on More of Old Golden Throat

More of Old Golden Throat
More of Old Golden Throat
More of Old Golden Throat